Otman Franklin "Otto" Wagonhurst (April 25, 1871 – June 15, 1932) was an American football player and coach. Wagonhurst played college football as a left tackle at the University of Pennsylvania from 1892 to 1895. He served as the head football coach at the University of Alabama in 1896 and at the University of Iowa in 1897, compiling a career record of 6–5. After coaching college football, he played professionally for Pittsburgh's Duquesne Country and Athletic Club and the Homestead Library and Athletic Club. He won circuit championship titles with Duquesne in 1898 and 1899 and Homestead in 1900. After his football career, he went on to become a railway executive. He died in 1932 in Jackson, Michigan and was buried in Akron, Ohio.

Head coaching record

References

1871 births
1932 deaths
19th-century players of American football
American football tackles
Alabama Crimson Tide football coaches
Duquesne Country and Athletic Club players
Homestead Library & Athletic Club players
Iowa Hawkeyes football coaches
Penn Quakers football players
American people in rail transportation
People from Wayne County, Pennsylvania
Coaches of American football from Pennsylvania
Players of American football from Pennsylvania